Fellowship of Companies for Christ International (FCCI) is a membership-based 501(c)(3)non-profit. Founded in 1977 as Fellowship of Companies for Christ (FCC) in Atlanta, Georgia.  In 1985, ‘International’ was added to the name to reflect the international vision. FCCI members include Christian business owners, CEOs, managing directors, professionals, and other business leaders. Members believe Jesus Christ can be a positive change agent in their personal lives, the culture of their workplaces and the broader marketplace where they conduct business.  While FCC originated with a small circle of business and ministry leaders in the 1970s in Atlanta, Georgia, US, FCCI now reports activities in over 100 nations, as of 12/2015.

Overview 
"The Fellowship of Companies for Christ International aims higher than your basic business-networking organization. It's a group that supplies spiritual inspiration and guidance for born-again-Christian CEOs"—Inc. Magazine

Fellowship of Companies for Christ International equips and encourages company leaders to operate their businesses and conduct their personal lives according to Biblical principles. For over 35 years, as a cross-denominational group, FCCI has been exploring the question: "What does it mean to run a company for Christ?" FCCI is now a global fellowship with a local vision, focused on personal, business and community transformation through a growing relationship with Christ, believing that Christ can change the world through how members do business.

Biblical mandate--FCCI embraces the discipleship of leaders and nations as described in Great Commission. FCCI's Vision is unique as it focuses on leaders' transformation impacting their personal lives, leadership styles, and business cultures that can lead to a transformation of their community, city and their respective nations. --"Transforming the world through Christ, one business leader at a time."

Long before What Would Jesus Do?-WWJD wristbands appeared in the 1990s, in the 1970s FCCI's founding circles wrestled with the question: "What would Jesus do--if He were running my company?" This question was penned by Charles Sheldon in 1896 in a series of articles that became the book In His Steps

FCCI is part of a revival of interest on matters of faith, expressly discussed in workplaces, including prayer, study, and discussion groups in break rooms, conference rooms and dedicated spaces allowing free expression of faith, in compliance with Title 7 requirements.

Cultural transformation 
FCCI sees business as a bridge to reach the world for Christ by allowing clients, employees, leaders, competitors, and stakeholders to experience the blessings that come with alignment to Biblical principles. A company's culture is positively impacted by an outflowing of the Abundant Life experienced by its leader. When a city, region or nation has enough leaders and businesses in alignment with Biblical principles, cultures can change through how business is done. FCCI promotes a purposeful strategy to positively impact the cultural hub cities around the world, expressed in the Influential Cities Outreach.

FCCI supports a broader movement of Fortune 500 Companies to proprietorships that allow free expression of faith within the (US Federal law)Title 7 context. FCCI estimated the number of workplace study and prayer groups was around 10,000.

Organizational structure and activities 
Operating as a 501c3 non-profit sustainable through membership and donations, FCCI produces an annual international conference drawing Christian business leaders from dozens of countries. Speakers address issues common to all business owners and leaders from a Biblical perspective. Live conference sessions are  streamed from the conference around the world and video is captured, segmented and uploaded for ongoing use in Business Leadership Groups in the US and other nations. The International Conference is a source of watershed moments for attendees, sometimes provoking transformational change in their personal or business lives The FCCI conference has also exhibited a catalytic effect, sometimes inspiring spinoffs when attendees return home.

FCCI Business Leadership Groups [BLGs] convene weekly or monthly for fellowship, encouragement, prayer, counsel and Godly wisdom. Business issues are discussed in the groups from a biblical perspective which considers the impact on both relationships and resources.

Concepts of Biblical stewardship are promoted to FCCI's membership and modeled by the organization, a founding member of the Evangelical Counsel for Financial Accountability ECFA FCCI promotes the Biblical concepts that our purpose in work: 1. is of utmost importance to God and 2. is key to eternal reward (Col 3:17, 23-24). Business as Missions and Business as Ministry is most effective when Eternal Purpose is clearly understood, Eternal Values are clearly communicated, taught and most importantly, modeled by business leaders. The preeminence of eternal purpose is central to all of FCCI's activities. This idea is reinforced by the name given to FCCI's process for developing leaders-Pathway to Purpose.
FCCI provides ongoing prayer support for CEOs, business leaders, their employees and others through a web-facilitated network of volunteers.

Staff 
FCCI's global fellowship is served by a small team of employees, supporting a cadre of distinguished volunteers leading Business Leadership Groups and Area Teams, all overseen by an International Board.

Notable participants 
In the 1970s, FCCI's founding circle included: Larry Burkett, Bert Stumberg, Bobby Mitchell, Bill Leonard, Jim Moye, Smith Lanier, Ben Lively, Thomas Harris and Jimmy Pursell.  Bruce Wilkinson, Larry Burkett, Walt Wiley, Ron Blue, Stanley Tam, Truett Cathy, Smith Lanier and Cade Willis were involved in the early years, providing teaching, training and leadership direction in various roles.
A few days after September 11, 2001, at the 2011 FCCI International Conference in Maui, Dr. Henry Blackaby spoke very powerfully in one of FCCI's most memorable moments. 
More recent content contributors for FCCI's conferences and group materials include: Ken Blanchard, Rick Warren, Dr. Richard Blackaby, John Townsend, Joel Manby [Undercover Boss], Tony Evans, Pat Gelsinger and Francis Chan.

Organizational milestone chronology

References

External links
FCCI

Organizations based in Georgia (U.S. state)
Business culture
Christian organizations based in the United States
Business ethics organizations
Business organizations based in the United States
Christian organizations established in the 20th century
Evangelical parachurch organizations
International business organizations